Take On the Twisters is a British game show in which four contestants must use a combination of knowledge and skill. It is broadcast on ITV and hosted by Julia Bradbury.

The show began airing on 22 July 2013 for a 30-episode run as a summer replacement for The Chase and finished on 30 August 2013.

Format
The show consists of three stages, with the aim primarily being to keep as many hourglasses from draining as possible, each timer containing different amounts of cash. In each episode four contestants compete against each other with the aim of answering as many questions correctly as possible.

Main round
At the start a question is posed to the player on the far left of the studio, the contestant can choose to Stick or Twist, depending on whether they think they know the answer or not. If they decide to Stick, they will answer the question themselves, however if they decide to Twist, they choose which of the other players will answer the question. Whichever option they choose, the three options to the question will then appear. If a player sticks and answers correctly, they get to light a Twister, but if incorrect, control passes to the next player in the line. If they Twist and the player the question is passed to gets the answer correct, they get to light a Twister, but if incorrect, the player who chose to Twist gets to light a Twister instead. Once the sixth Twister is lit, the player in control gets to 'Take on the Twisters' to bank some money. They face 60 seconds of quick-fire general knowledge questions, with the idea to keep as many of the Twisters in play as possible. Once the time is up, the values of the Twisters remaining in play are revealed and the total amount of money is placed in the contestant's bank. This is repeated 4 times each show.

Final Twist
The contestant who has banked the highest amount of cash from the main round goes through to play the "Final Twist" where they can win whatever they have banked in the main game. In this round, all 8 Twisters are in play and the idea is to keep as many of them in play as possible after 60 seconds of quick-fire questions. When the time is up, Julia will offer £200 (£250 in later episodes) for each Twister that remains in play, for example if the player has 5 Twisters in play, £1000 (£1250 under the £250 a Twister rule) will be offered. The contestant's money has been placed behind one of the Twisters by an independent adjudicator. One by one, the Twisters in play are revealed to determine whether the money is there. If it is not there, a red "X" will appear on the display, but if the money is there, a gold "WIN" will appear.

The Twisters
There are eight "Twisters" in the show. The colours are red, yellow, blue, orange, green, pink, white, and purple, each worth different amounts of cash ranging from £300 to £1,000. The Twisters containing more cash will drain more quickly. If the values of all eight Twisters are revealed, then their amounts are worth double and will remain doubled for the rest of the game.

References

External links

2013 British television series debuts
2013 British television series endings
2010s British game shows
English-language television shows
ITV game shows
Television series by ITV Studios